510–516 Ohio Street is a historic commercial building located at Terre Haute, Vigo County, Indiana. It was built in 1891–1892, and is a three-story, rectangular, Italianate style brick building. It features stone, cast iron, and pressed metal decorative elements. It was renovated in 1975.

It was listed on the National Register of Historic Places on June 30, 1983.

References

Commercial buildings on the National Register of Historic Places in Indiana
Italianate architecture in Indiana
Commercial buildings completed in 1892
Buildings and structures in Terre Haute, Indiana
National Register of Historic Places in Terre Haute, Indiana